21st Century Curridabat is a local political party in Curridabat Canton, Costa Rica. It is considered the most successful local party in the country as all Curridabat mayors have come from the party. The party also often controls the majority of the Municipal Council.

Curridabat first mayor elected in 2002 at the first Costa Rican mayoral elections was Lucy Retana. Retana did not run for re-election and was succeeded by Edgar Mora, the party's nominee for the 2006 election. Mora won re-election in all later elections. After the 2016 municipal election won also all the District's Syndics and 3 out of 7 members of the Municipal Council.

References

Local government in Costa Rica
Political parties in Costa Rica
Political parties established in 1997